Žídek (feminine Žídková) is a Czech surname. Notable people with the surnames include:

Anna Carin Zidek (born 1973), Swedish biathlete
Ivo Žídek (1926–2003), Czech opera singer
George Zidek (born 1973), Czech basketball player who played in the National Basketball Association in the 1990s
Jiří Zídek Sr. (born 1944), Czech basketball player, father of George Zidek
Jiri Zidek (paleontologist), Czech-born American paleontologist
Radoslav Židek (born 1981), Slovak snowboarder

See also
58578 Žídek, a main belt asteroid

Czech-language surnames